{{DISPLAYTITLE:C18H27NO}}
The molecular formula C18H27NO (molar mass: 273.41 g/mol, exact mass: 273.2093 u) may refer to:

 3-MeO-PCP (3-Methoxyphencyclidine)
 4-MeO-PCP (4-Methoxyphencyclidine)